Soğuksu Creek is a creek in Mersin Province, Turkey. It is a short creek formed by merging two small streams just north of Aydıncık ilçe (district) . Like most other creeks in the province its flow rate fluctuates during the year. But even in the hottest season it doesn't dry up.

Rivers of Mersin Province
Aydıncık District (Mersin)